The 1978 Ottawa Rough Riders finished in 1st place in the Eastern Conference with a 12–4 record.

In 1978, Tony Gabriel was named the Outstanding Player in the CFL. He was the first Canadian to win that honour since Russ Jackson in 1969. No other Canadian has won the award since Gabriel. By 1978, Condredge Holloway's interception totals had dropped from 9, 6 and 5 in his first three years to just 2 on 214 attempts in 1978. Holloway's share of Ottawa's passing yards was between 25.7 – 32.8 percent over the first three years. In 1978, it soared to 49.7 percent. Holloway's higher profile and obvious improvement would be factors in Clements' May, 1979 trade to Saskatchewan.

Preseason

Regular season

Standings

Schedule

Postseason

Player stats

Passing

Receiving

Rushing

Awards and honours
CFL's Most Outstanding Player Award – Tony Gabriel (TE)
CFL's Most Outstanding Canadian Award – Tony Gabriel (TE)
CFL's Most Outstanding Offensive Lineman Award – Jim Coode (OT)

References

Ottawa Rough Riders seasons
1978 Canadian Football League season by team